Richard Belton (8 July 1913 – 29 May 1974) was an Irish politician and medical doctor. He was elected to Seanad Éireann on the Administrative Panel at the 1969 election, for Fine Gael. He lost his seat at the 1973 Seanad election.

Other members of the Belton family to have served in the Oireachtas include his father Patrick Belton, his brothers Jack Belton and Paddy Belton, his cousin Luke Belton and his daughter Avril Doyle.

He was born in Dublin, the eldest of 4 brothers. He attended school at Belvedere College and studied medicine at University College Dublin. He was a member of Dún Laoghaire Corporation for 30 years. He served as Chairman of the Dublin Health Authority and was also a member of the Eastern Health Board and of the Governing Body of University College Dublin.

He was an international bridge player and represented Ireland on many occasions.

See also
Families in the Oireachtas

References

External links
 

1913 births
1974 deaths
Fine Gael senators
Members of the 12th Seanad
Irish contract bridge players
Belton family
People educated at Belvedere College